St. Lawrence North is a Canadian documentary television series which first aired on CBC Television. It was produced by the National Film Board of Canada, which contracted Crawley Films to produce the English version. The first nine episodes aired in 1960; four films  produced in 1963 were added and it was released as a full documentary in 1998.

Premise
This series of documentaries concerns the life and land north of the Saint Lawrence River, particularly in northern Quebec and Labrador. Topics include hunting, First Nations lifestyles and the effects of industries such as mining in this region.

Scheduling
This half-hour series was first broadcast on Saturdays at 5:00 p.m. from 2 July to 24 September 1960. It was rebroadcast at various times throughout the 1960s.

Episodes
 Canadian Diamonds (1960)
 Ka Ke Ki Ku (1960)
 The Land of Jacques Cartier (1960)
 On the Sea (1960)
 Soirée at St. Hilarion (1960)
 Three Seasons (1960)
 Turlutte (1960)
 White-Whale Hunters of Anse-Aux-Basques(1960)
 Winter Crossing at L'Isle-Aux-Coudres (1960)
 Attiuk (1963)
 The Jean Richard (1963)
 Whalehead (1963)
 Winter Sealing at La Tabatière (1963)

Reception
St. Lawrence North was sold to broadcasters in Australia, Italy and West Germany.

References

External links
 
 St. Lawrence North at National Film Board

CBC Television original programming
1960 Canadian television series debuts
1967 Canadian television series endings